This is a list of New Zealand television  events and premieres occurred, or are scheduled to occur, in 2011, the 51st year of continuous operation of television in New Zealand.

Events 
6 February –  Four begins airing. This network focuses on programming for children, with shows such as Sesame Street, Bob the Builder, Thomas and Friends, Peppa Pig, Barney & Friends and several Nickelodeon television shows including original Nicktoons such as Rugrats, Rocko's Modern Life, The Fairly OddParents!, Invader Zim and Hey Arnold! during the day and a range of programmes aimed at audiences aged 18 to 49 in the evenings. The first programme to air on Four was The Simpsons episode Elementary School Musical.
7 February – New Zealand fantasy comedy-drama television series The Almighty Johnsons begins on TV3.
28 February – TVNZ 6 closes down. Some TVNZ 6 content, including Kidzone and Shortland Street: From the Beginning, are moved to sister channels TVNZ 7, TVNZ Heartland and TVNZ Kidzone24.
13 March – TVNZ U, a social channel aimed at 15 to 24 year olds, is launched.

Premieres

Domestic series

International series

Telemovies and miniseries

Documentaries

Specials

Programming changes

Programmes changing networks 
Criterion for inclusion in the following list is that New Zealand premiere episodes will air in New Zealand for the first time on the new network. This includes when a programme is moved from a free-to-air network's primary channel to a digital multi-channel, as well as when a programme moves between subscription television channels – provided the preceding criterion is met. Ended television series which change networks for repeat broadcasts are not included in the list.

Free-to-air premieres
This is a list of programmes which made their premiere on New Zealand free-to-air television that had previously premiered on New Zealand subscription television. Programmes may still air on the original subscription television network.

Subscription premieres
This is a list of programmes which made their premiere on New Zealand subscription television that had previously premiered on New Zealand free-to-air television. Programmes may still air on the original free-to-air television network.

Programmes returning in 2011

Milestone episodes in 2011

Programmes ending in 2011

Deaths

References

 
Television